Dropsie College for Hebrew and Cognate Learning or Dropsie University, at 2321–2335 N Broad St., Philadelphia, Pennsylvania, was America's first degree-granting institution for post-doctoral Jewish studies. Funded by the will of Moses Aaron Dropsie  (1821–1905), it was chartered in 1907, and its first building was completed in 1912. It ceased to grant degrees in 1986.

The Dropsie University Complex's buildings were placed on Philadelphia's roster of historic buildings as of November 30, 1971.  The Dropsie University Complex was named a national historic landmark (NRHP) on January 17, 1975.

After a brief period as the Annenberg Research Institute (1986–1993) Dropsie ceased to be an independent organization, and became part of the University of Pennsylvania. Its name changed several times and it was relocated, becoming the Katz Center for Advanced Judaic Studies.

History
Dropsie College for Hebrew and Cognate Learning was founded in 1788. Its main benefactor was Moses Aaron Dropsie (1821–1905), a wealthy man whose father was Jewish and mother was Christian but who self-identified as Jewish from the age of 14. In 1905, Dropsie left his entire fortune for the establishment of a Jewish college along broad lines, offering instruction "in the Hebrew and cognate languages and their respective literatures, and in the rabbinical learning and literature." Estimated at about $800,000, the amount of this bequest was the largest sum that had been made available for the promotion of Jewish studies.

Dropsie College may have been designed by Lewis Pilcher or by Abraham Levy. 
It was built at Broad and York Streets.  It was near the historic Spanish and Portuguese Congregation Mikveh Israel, Philadelphia's first Jewish congregation, then at 2321 N Broad Street.
The first three presidents of Dropsie (Mayer Sulzberger, Cyrus Adler and Abraham Neuman) were worshipers there. They were instrumental in establishing the college and its library. Dropsie College sought to be grounded in the values, history, and "Science of Judaism."

On November 9, 1981, a fire ravaged the school's building at Broad and York Streets. In December 1983, the school moved to Temple Adath Israel of the Main Line in Merion where it was welcomed rent-free.

Dropsie granted more than 200 Ph.D.s between its inception and its closing as a degree-granting institution in 1986.  Dropsie was also the publisher of the Jewish Quarterly Review, which was at the time the most respected journal on the subject.

The faculty at Dropsie included scholars from outside the United States, including Benzion Netanyahu, who came from Jerusalem with his young sons, Yonatan (Yoni) and Benjamin (Bibi), who there had their first true exposures to American culture, which would become a touchstone for later interactions with the American public for Bibi.

Notable people

Dropsie students
 Barry J. Beitzel (1942–), American biblical and geographical scholar, professor of Old Testament and Hebrew, and Bible translator.
 Larry L. Walker (1932–2021), American biblical scholar, professor of Old Testament and Hebrew, and Bible translator
 Kenneth L. Barker (1931–), American biblical scholar, professor of Old Testament and Hebrew, and Bible translator
 Philip Birnbaum (1904–1988), Polish-American author and translator, best known for his translation of the siddur
 Joshua Bloch (1890–1957), Lithuanian-American rabbi and librarian
 Raymond B. Dillard (1944–1993), American Old Testament scholar
 Iris Habib Elmasry (1910–1994), Coptic historian and scholar
 [[Simon Ginzburg] (1890–1944), Hebrew poet, critic and historian. Obtained a PhD from Dropsie in 1923. Translated the letters of the Ramchal. 
 Cyrus H. Gordon (1908–2001), Near East scholar – did not graduate
 R. Laird Harris (1911–2008), American Presbyterian minister and Old Testament scholar
 Louis L. Kaplan (1902–2001), President of Baltimore Hebrew University 1930–1970, Acting Chancellor of the University of Maryland, Baltimore County 1976–1977
 Meredith G. Kline (1922–2007), American theologian and Old Testament scholar – Ph.D. in Assyriology and Egyptology
 Samuel Noah Kramer (1897–1990), Ukrainian-American Assyriologist and Sumeriologist – did not graduate; transferred to Penn
 Albert L. Lewis  (1917–2008), Congregational rabbi and professor of homiletics at the Jewish Theological Seminary of America
 Benzion Netanyahu (1910–2012), Zionist, scholar of Jewish history, and father of Israeli Prime Minister Benjamin Netanyahu
 Bernard Revel (1885–1940), future head of RIETS yeshiva and founder/President of Yeshiva College. 1911 doctoral thesis on Karaite Judaism
 Ephraim Speiser (1902–1965) Near East scholar and archaeologist, excavator of Tepe Gawra
 Edward J. Young (1907–1968), American Old Testament scholar and commentator
 Terry L. Eves (1952–2019), American biblical theology scholar and Professor of Old Testament
 Ronald F. Youngblood (1931–2014), American biblical scholar and Professor of Old Testament

Dropsie faculty
 Cyrus Adler, Jewish religious leader and scholar – president
 William Chomsky, noted Hebrew scholar and father of Noam Chomsky
 Benzion Halper, Hebraist and Arabist
 Benzion Netanyahu, historian of Jews in medieval Spain and father of Binyamin Netanyahu and Yonatan Netanyahu
 Raphael Patai, ethnographer and anthropologist – professor of anthropology, 1948–1957
 Stefan Reif, Jewish researcher – assistant professor of Hebrew, 1972–1973
 Solomon Zeitlin, historian of the second Jewish commonwealth and early Christianity.
 Solomon Gandz, research professor of the history of Semitic Civilization

Reformation  
By 1980, Dropsie College was near failing, its building in need of repairs and many of its books missing.  On November 9, 1981, newly elected president David M. Goldenberg was notified of an arson attack, taking place on the forty-third anniversary of Kristallnacht. Attempts to put out the fire irreparably damaged the library and its contents, including rare books and ancient cuneiform tablets.

Goldenberg launched an extensive campaign to recover and restore the library, while board member Albert J. Wood worked to transform the  College into a post-graduate research center. Wood attracted the support of philanthropist Walter Annenberg. Wood became the founding chairman of the board of the briefly renamed Moses Aaron Dropsie Research Institute, followed by Walter Annenberg as of September 13, 1985. 
 
As of September 1986, Dropsie College ceased to be a degree-granting college. Also in 1986, Dropsie was renamed the Annenberg Research Institute. Annenberg funded the construction of a new building, to which the institution moved in 1988. The new location was just three blocks south of the new location of congregation Mikveh Israel, as well as the National Museum of American Jewish History. The proposed goal of the new institution was to support dialogue among the mono-theistic faiths of Judaism, Christianity and Islam. Its directors were Bernard Lewis (1986–1990), Eric M. Meyers (1991–1992), and as acting director, David M. Goldenberg (1992–1993).

In 1993, the Annenberg Research Institute ceased to be an independent organization. It became part of the University of Pennsylvania, as the Center for Judaic Studies. In 1998, it was renamed the Center for Advanced Judaic Studies, and in 2008, the Herbert D. Katz Center for Advanced Judaic Studies. It is part of the Penn library system.

Archives
The institutional records and library collections of Dropsie College are now part of the collections of the Herbert D. Katz Center for Advanced Judaic Studies, which is part of the University of Pennsylvania's library system.

References

See also

Judaic studies
Jewish studies research institutes
National Register of Historic Places in Philadelphia
Educational institutions established in 1907
Beaux-Arts architecture in Pennsylvania
Renaissance Revival architecture in Pennsylvania
Historic districts in Philadelphia
1907 establishments in Pennsylvania
Old City, Philadelphia
1986 disestablishments in Pennsylvania
Jewish universities and colleges in the United States
Dropsie College for Hebrew and Cognate Learning